Katherine "Kati" Hadford (born 24 July 1989) is a Hungarian-American former competitive figure skater who skated internationally for Hungary. She is the 2008 and 2010 Hungarian national silver medalist and three time (2006, 2007, 2009) bronze medalist.

Personal life
Hadford was born in Vienna, Virginia, United States in the United States. Her mother is a Hungarian citizen and her grandparents (György Szele and Kornélia Széchényi) fled Hungary in the 1950s to escape communism. She is related to István Széchenyi.

She moved to Hungary when she began representing that country in competition. She is bilingual in Hungarian and English.

Career
Hadford previously skated for the United States. Hadford began representing Hungary internationally in the 2006/2007 season.

Competitive highlights

For Hungary

For the United States

References

External links

 
 Hadford's Hungarian website: http://katihadford.eoldal.hu

American female single skaters
Hungarian female single skaters
1989 births
Living people
Katherine
People from Vienna, Virginia
Sportspeople from Fairfax County, Virginia
American people of Hungarian descent
American emigrants to Hungary